Hutcheson is a surname. Notable people with the surname include:

Bellenden Seymour Hutcheson (1883–1954), VC recipient in World War I
Charles Sterling Hutcheson (1894–1969), U.S. District judge for the Eastern District of Virginia
David Hutcheson (footballer) (1892–1962), Scottish footballer
Francis Hutcheson (philosopher) (1694–1746), philosopher
Francis Hutcheson (songwriter) (c. 1722–1773), his son
John Hutcheson, several people
Joseph Collier Hutcheson (1906–1972), Virginia lawyer and state senator, brother of Charles Sterling Hutcheson
Joseph Chappell Hutcheson (1842–1924), Texas politician
Thad Hutcheson (1915–1986), Texas Republican politician
George Hutcheson (–1639),  joint-founder with his younger brother Thomas Hutcheson, of Hutchesons Hospital, Glasgow.

See also
Hutchison (disambiguation)
Hutchinson (disambiguation)

Scottish surnames

Surnames of Ulster-Scottish origin